Edward David Taussig (November 20, 1847 January 29, 1921) was a decorated Rear Admiral in the United States Navy. He is best remembered for being the officer to claim Wake Island after the Spanish–American War, as well as accepting the physical relinquishment of Guam by its Spanish governor following the Treaty of Paris in which Spain ceded Guam to the United States following nearly 300 years of colonial rule. Taussig briefly served as Governor of Guam. He was the first of a four-generational family of United States Naval Academy graduates including his son, Vice Admiral Joseph K. Taussig (1877–1947), grandson Captain Joseph K. Taussig Jr. (1920–1999), and great-grandson, Captain Joseph K. Taussig USMC (1945–).

Early sea service
Taussig was born in St. Louis, Missouri, the son of a wool broker, Charles and his wife, Anna (Abeles), who had emigrated from Austria in 1840. His family was Jewish, but he was brought up in the Unitarian Church. He was appointed to the U.S. Naval Academy during the Civil War and entered on July 23, 1863. He was commissioned an ensign on 18 December 1868. His early sea service was perhaps most remarkable for his time as a passed midshipman on the gunboat  when a tsunami washed her far inland at Arica (then part of Peru), on 13 August 1868. He was decorated for his actions during this event.

1870s–1890s service

During special duty, Navy Department, Washington, D.C. (December 1890 April 1894) Taussig was involved in managing the navy's exhibit at the Columbian Exposition, including the full-size mock-up battleship Illinois, where he was executive officer, following his promotion to lieutenant commander on 19 June 1892. Thereafter, his assignments were executive officer, North Atlantic Squadron (April 1894 September 1895); executive officer, receiving ship , Philadelphia Navy Yard (October 1895 February 1896); executive officer, Pacific Squadron (February September 1896); Hydrographic Office, Washington, D.C. (September December 1896); hydrographic inspector, U.S. Coast and Geodetic Survey, Washington, D.C. (December 1896 August 1897); coast survey steamer Blake (August 1897 May 1898); and Norfolk Navy Yard (June July 1898).

Wake Island, Guam and the Philippine–American War
Promoted to the rank of commander on 10 August 1898, his first command was the gunboat , which departed San Francisco on 18 September bound for Hawaii, Guam and duty with the Asiatic Squadron, in the aftermath of the 12 August 1898 Spanish–American War armistice.  arrived in Hawaii on 27 September 1898 and spent the next three months operating in local waters and conducting surveys, including Pearl Harbor. In December of that year, Taussig was given orders to proceed to Wake Island and claim it for the United States. After ten days passage from Honolulu, he arrived to formally claim the island on 17 January 1899. At one p.m. a flagstaff was placed, and with sailors in dress whites forming two ranks, Taussig called all to witness that the island was not in the possession of any other nation and declared it in possession of the United States. Taussig ordered the American flag raised by Ensign Wettengell and  gave a 21-gun salute when the flag reached the truck. At the time President William McKinley ordering that Wake Island be claimed as a U.S. possession was seen as questionable; however, no other nation had claimed the island and there was no native population. Wake Island was primarily taken for its strategic value as a cable station, midway between Hawaii and the Philippines.

Departing from Wake Island at 5:35 p.m. on 17 January 1899,  arrived at Guam on 23 January 1899.  The island previously had been captured on 21 June 1898 by Captain Henry Glass of the  who had left Francisco Portusach Martínez, an American civilian, in charge of the territory.  Captain Glass is reported to have told Martínez, the only American on Guam, to "take care of the island until some other officers or man-of-war might reach Guam." Although this has never been confirmed by the U.S. Navy, it was widely believed to be true. Martínez had been deposed in favor of non-American leadership under José Sisto, the highest ranking Spanish civil official in the island, and then Venancio Roberto, each laying competing claims to governance. Venancio Roberto's claim was rebuked in favor of Sisto by Lieutenant Commander Vincendon L. Cottman, commander of the U.S. Navy collier  that had arrived at Guam on New Year's Day 1899 en route back to the U.S from the Spanish–American War. However Sisto's authority was short-lived.

On February 1, Sisto officially relinquished control of the governmental and administrative affairs of Guam to Taussig and Cottman. In his short time on Guam, Commander Taussig set up a local council system of temporary government which lasted until the arrival of Lieutenant Louis A. Kaiser in July 1899 under orders to conduct navy surveillance of affairs of Guam. Taussig also supervised the establishment of signal stations and a port survey. On April 15, 1899, Admiral George Dewey cabled the Navy Department in Washington, " arrived six days from Guam. Quiet and order there. Most friendly to Americans. Native Government established by Taussig working well. Native soldiers fine body of men. (United States Naval Transport) in Guam."

Departing Guam in mid-February 1899, Commander Taussig and  continued on to Manila, where the ship arrived on 22 February 1899 with the mission of supporting the Army's campaigns during the Philippine–American War primarily with patrol and escort duty. According to press reports, Watson resented Taussig's verbal opposition, and a heated argument between the two ensued. Following his return to San Francisco on the hospital ship, Commander Taussig requested an investigation.

He was assigned to duty with the United States Lighthouse Board as 13th District Inspector in Portland, Oregon from October 1899 to April 1900. However, Commander Taussig did not have to wait long for vindication, when in March 1900, public accounts surfaced of Watson's friction with officers under his command and with the Bureau of Navigation over Watson's choice of Commander C. C. Cornwall as his executive officer, which the Bureau disapproved. Due to health reasons, Watson was himself privately relieved of command months before the public announcement in March 1900 that he was to be relieved by Rear Admiral George C. Remey. Watson returned home on his flagship  in April 1900, the same month that Commander Taussig's duty as lighthouse inspector ended.

The China Relief Expedition (Boxer Rebellion)
In the spring of 1900, Chinese xenophobia, including disdain for the presence of Christian missionaries, fueled by decades of Western economic exploitation, culminated in the Boxer Rebellion. The Society of Righteous and Harmonious Fists, whose members were referred to in the West as "Boxers", besieged the foreign legations at Peking and at Tientsin. An international relief force was hastily assembled and sent to relieve the siege. In August, with  stationed off Chefoo, China, Taussig cabled dispatches of the decisive Battle of Beicang from which the Chinese military never recovered. The gunboat departed Shanghai on 10 September, reaching Cavite on the 17th. In the Philippines,  resumed her prior cooperation with Army forces, engaged in pacification efforts for the next two years.

Later years
Thereafter, Taussig's assignments were to the Washington Navy Yard (November 1901 January 1902); ordnance office, Boston Navy Yard (January May 1902); and commander, training ship,  (May–October 1902). Promoted to captain on 7 November 1902, he served as yard captain, Pensacola Navy Yard (January October 1903); commander, receiving ship , Mare Island, California (October 1903 October 1904); and commander, North Atlantic Squadron (November 1904 January 1906).

Following his command of Massachusetts, he was commander, of the training ship  (January December 1906); yard captain, New York Navy Yard (March May 1907); general court martial duty, League Island Navy Yard (Pennsylvania) (May December 1907); commandant, Norfolk Navy Yard and Fifth Naval District (December 1907 November 1909).

While at Norfolk he was promoted to rear admiral on 15 May 1908. Rear Admiral Taussig was placed on the U.S. Navy retired list on 20 November 1909.

In 1909 he became a companion of the District of Columbia Commandery of the Military Order of the Loyal Legion of the United States—a military society consisting of officers who had served in the Union armed forces during the American Civil War.

World War I
During World War I, Taussig was recalled to active duty as commandant of the Naval Unit at Columbia University (September December 1918).

Dates of rank
 United States Naval Academy Midshipman Class of 1867

Service Medals

United States awards

The original service criteria for the Spanish Campaign Medal promulgated in Navy Department Special Order No. 81 of June 27, 1908 required service on specific vessels and time periods for which Taussig's service during the Spanish–American War did not qualify.  However, in the early 1920s, the award criteria were relaxed to provide for award of the medal to all those who served in the U.S. Navy or Marine Corps during the Spanish–American War. The first government contract to supply campaign medals to the expanded recipient base with the Bastian Brothers Company was not until 1922. Rear Admiral Taussig died in January 1921 prior to the expanded eligibility period for the Spanish Campaign and so never received the Spanish Campaign Medal.

Personal life
Edward D. Taussig married Ellen Knefler on 9 November 1873. They had five sons, including vice admiral Joseph K. Taussig and Charles, who was a prominent New York attorney.  A third son, Paul, died of appendicitis in July 1894, while a midshipman at the U.S. Naval Academy. Edward D. Taussig died at Newport, Rhode Island, on 29 January 1921 and is buried at the United States Naval Academy Cemetery along with his wife and son, Paul.

Namesake
 The Allen M. Sumner class destroyer  (DD-746), commissioned from 1944 to 1974, was named for him.
 Admiral Taussig Boulevard at Naval Station Norfolk in Norfolk, Virginia, is named for him.https://pilotonline.com/news/local/history/article_bc00d5b4-6eb1-5c94-9a6f-a46155a1d245.html

References

 "Naval Orders; Disposition of the Commander and Officers of the Atlanta". The Washington Post. Sep 17, 1895. pg. 7, 1 pgs
 "Department Notes". The Washington Post. Dec 12, 1896. pg. 7, 1 pgs
 "Capt. Rob Evans's Message". From The Baltimore Sun. New York Times. Aug 1, 1898. pg. 4, 1 pgs
 "Now Naval Commanders". The Washington Post. Aug 3, 1898. pg. 7, 1 pgs
 "To Take Wake Island". The Washington Post. Dec 24, 1898. pg. 1, 1 pgs
 "Takes Guam Island". Los Angeles Times. Dec 24, 1898. pg. 3, 1 pgs
 "Wake Island Occupation". New York Times. Mar 22, 1899. pg. 5, 1 pgs
 "The Government of Guam- Admiral Dewey Cables that the American Regime Starts Off Well- Garrison of Native Soldiers" New York Times. April 16, 1899
 "Funston's Men Sail Soon". Chicago Daily Tribune. Sep 2, 1899. pg. 3, 1 pgs
 "Action in Taussig's Case". New York Times. Oct 24, 1899. pg. 7, 1 pgs
 "Commander Taussig Ordered to Manila". New York Times. Mar 25, 1900. pg. 9, 1 pgs
 "The United Service". New York Times. Dec 31, 1901. pg. 3, 1 pgs
 "The United Service". New York Times. Oct 23, 1902. pg. 13, 1 pgs
 "The Cruiser Controversy". The Washington Post. Oct 23, 1902. pg. 4, 1 pgs
 "The United Service". New York Times. Jan 6, 1903. pg. 10, 1 pgs
 "The United Service". New York Times. Aug 8, 1903. pg. 10, 1 pgs
 "Changes in Command". The Washington Post. Oct 13, 1904. pg. 11, 1 pgs
 "Jones' Body Entombed at the Naval Academy- Impressive Ceremony Attends the Transfer from Brooklyn- French Jackies in Line". New York Times. July 25, 1905, 1 pg.
 "Navy Orders". The Washington Post. Jan 7, 1906. pg. 5, 1 pgs
 "Gets Leave to Visit Home". The Washington Post. Dec 11, 1907. pg. 9, 1 pgs
 "Globe Girdled, 16 Battleships Come Home Today". The Atlanta Constitution. Feb 22, 1909. pg. 1, 2 pgs
 "Rites for Admiral Taussig". The Washington Post. Feb 2, 1921. pg. 3, 1 pg
 Jillette Leon-Guerrero, Massachusetts, "Guam Leaders from 1899–1904", © 2009 Guampedia™
 Cogar, William B., "Dictionary of Admirals of the U.S. Navy", vol. 2, 1901–1918, pp. 274–275
 Boston Evening Transcript, October 7, 1899, p. 5
 Hawaiian Gazette, March 16, 1900, p. 7
 New York Times, September 12, 1900
 Brooklyn Daily Eagle, August 6, 1900

External links
 
 Register of the Edward D. Taussig Papers, USN War College, Naval Historical Collection, Newport, Rhode Island
 
 USN Service Medal Index, Naval History and Heritage Command

1847 births
1921 deaths
United States Naval Academy alumni
United States Navy admirals
Governors of Guam
Wake Island
American people of Austrian-Jewish descent
Jewish American military personnel
American military personnel of the Spanish–American War
United States Navy personnel of World War I
Burials at the United States Naval Academy Cemetery
Guamanian Jews
Military personnel from St. Louis